The Citizens' Movement was a political party in Iceland, founded in the lead up to the 2009 election during the Global Recession, which severely affected Iceland.

In the election, the Citizens' Movement won 4 out of 63 seats in Althingi, the Icelandic Parliament. The elected members were 
Þráinn Bertelsson, film director
Þór Saari, economist
Margrét Tryggvadóttir, editor
Birgitta Jónsdóttir, poet, editor and artist

The party had no leader, but rather was led collectively by three people each with a different responsibility. The party supported radical change at the government level in response to the recession.

On 14 August 2009 Þráinn Bertelsson left the party to sit as an independent. On 18 September 2009 the remaining three members left the party to create a new party, Hreyfingin (The Movement), and so the Citizens' Movement is no longer represented in the Althingi.

Election results

References

External links
Party website of the Citizens' Movement

2009 establishments in Iceland
2012 establishments in Iceland
Defunct political parties in Iceland
Political parties disestablished in 2012
Political parties established in 2009